Dimăcheni is a commune in Botoșani County, Western Moldavia, Romania. It is composed of three villages: Dimăcheni, Mateieni and Recia-Verbia. Located on the once-strategic road between fortress of Hotin and Suceava, Verbia was the site of two decisive battles in the history of Moldavia: the November 1561 clash between Iacob Heraclid and Alexandru Lăpușneanu; and Michael the Brave's defeat of Ieremia Movilă in May 1600.

References

Communes in Botoșani County
Localities in Western Moldavia